Senator Worth may refer to:

Jacob Worth (1838–1905), New York State Senate
John M. Worth (died 1900), North Carolina State Senate

See also
Peter Wirth (politician) (born 1961), New Mexico State Senate
Tim Wirth (born 1939), U.S. Senator from Colorado from 1987 to 1993